Han-Na Chang (Korean: 장한나, Hanja: 張漢娜,  ; born December 23, 1982) is a South Korean conductor and cellist.

Born in Suwon, Gyeonggi-do, South Korea, Chang began studying piano at age 3, and cello at age 6.  In 1993, her family moved to the United States, where she was enrolled in the pre-college division of the Juilliard School.  In 1993, she attended Mischa Maisky's masterclasses in Siena, Italy, and continued to study with him privately.  In 1994, she competed in the Fifth Rostropovich International Cello Competition, and was awarded the First Prize as well as the Contemporary Music Prize.  Chang subsequently studied privately with Mstislav Rostropovich.  In 1995, she made her debut recording of Tchaikovsky's Variations on a Rococo Theme and Saint-Saëns' Cello Concerto No. 1 with Rostropovich conducting the London Symphony Orchestra.  In addition to studies at Juilliard, Chang read philosophy at Harvard University.

Chang subsequently developed an interest in conducting, and studied with James DePreist.  She made her professional conducting debut in Korea in 2007.  In 2009, she founded the Absolute Classic Festival, based in Gyeonggi Province, Korea, with a focus on young musicians, and serves as its artistic director.  Chang made her UK conducting debut with the Philharmonia Orchestra in January 2012, and conducted the Royal Liverpool Philharmonic for the first time in February 2012.  She has now shifted her musical focus to conducting, away from cello performances.

Chang first guest-conducted the Qatar Philharmonic Orchestra in June 2012.  In December 2012, the orchestra named her its next music director.  She led the orchestra in its first-ever appearance at The Proms on 7 September 2014.  The next day, 8 September 2014, Chang resigned the music directorship of the orchestra, with immediate effect, citing "persistent administrative difficulties and irreconcilable artistic differences with the management".

Chang became principal guest conductor of the Trondheim Symphony Orchestra as of the 2013–2014 season.  In March 2016, the orchestra announced the appointment of Chang as its next chief conductor, effective with the 2017–2018 season.  She is the first female conductor to be named chief conductor of the Trondheim Symphony Orchestra.  In November 2018, the orchestra announced the extension of Chang's contract as chief conductor through the 2022–2023 season.
Chang has been appointed as Erste Gastdirigentin (Principal Guest Conductor) for Symphoniker Hamburg - Laeiszhalle Orchester, starting with the 2022–2023 season.

Awards
 Named a Classical Super-star of Tomorrow by Gramophone Magazine (UK) (2006)

Albums
 Vivaldi Cello Concertos (2008)
 Romance - Lalo Cello Concerto & other pieces (2007)
 Shostakovich Cello Concerto No. 1/ Cello Sonata (2006)
 Prokofiev Sinfonia Concertante/ Cello Sonata (2003)
 The Swan (2001)
 Haydn Cello Concerto C major and D major (1998)
 Tchaikovsky Rococo Variations/Saint-Saëns Cello Concerto No. 1 (1996)

References

Sources
 Yoshihara, Mari (2007). Musicians from a different shore: Asians and Asian Americans in classical music. Temple University Press.

External links
 
 
 Musical World page on Han-Na Chang
 Concours de violoncelle Rostropovitch, list of award winners
 

South Korean classical cellists
South Korean conductors (music)
Harvard University alumni
People from Suwon
1982 births
Living people
Women conductors (music)
Women cellists
South Korean women classical cellists
21st-century women musicians
21st-century conductors (music)
21st-century cellists